Cattail Cove State Park is a state park of Arizona, USA, on the shore of Lake Havasu. The park is public land managed by the Arizona State Parks, and available to the public for recreational purposes.

Aquatic species
 Largemouth Bass
 Smallmouth Bass
 Striped Bass
 Crappie
 Sunfish
 Catfish (Channel)
 Catfish (Flathead)
 Carp
 Bullfrogs

External links
Cattail Cove State Park
Arizona Boating Locations Facilities Map
Arizona Fishing Locations Map

1970 establishments in Arizona
Lake Havasu
Parks in Mohave County, Arizona
Protected areas established in 1970
Protected areas on the Colorado River
State parks of Arizona